Bar-Ilan University (BIU, Universitat Bar-Ilan) is a public research university in the Tel Aviv District city of Ramat Gan, Israel. Established in 1955, Bar Ilan is Israel's second-largest academic institution. It has about 20,000 students and 1,350 faculty members.

Bar-Ilan's mission is to "blend Jewish tradition with modern technologies and scholarship and the university endeavors to ... teach the Jewish heritage to all its students while providing [an] academic education."

History

Bar-Ilan University has Jewish-American roots: It was conceived in Atlanta in a meeting of the American Mizrahi organization in 1950, and was founded by Professor Pinkhos Churgin, an American Orthodox rabbi and educator, who was president from 1955 to 1957 where he was succeeded by Joseph H. Lookstein who was president from 1957 to 1967. When it was opened in 1955, it was described by The New York Times "as Cultural Link Between the [Israeli] Republic and America". Presidents who followed were Max Jammer (1967–77), Emanuel Rackman (1977–86), Michael Albeck (1986–89), Ernest Krausz (1989), Zvi Arad (1989–92), and Shlomo Eckstein (1992–96).

The university was named for Rabbi Meir Bar-Ilan (originally Meir Berlin), a Religious Zionist leader who served as the inspiration for its establishment. Although he was trained in Orthodox seminaries in Berlin, he believed there was a need for an institution providing a dual curriculum of secular academic studies and religious Torah studies.

BIU's student population is diverse and includes both Jewish and non-Jewish students.

At least ten courses in Jewish studies are required for graduation. These are available as academic Jewish studies courses, as well as through more traditional Torah study, offered primarily by the Machon HaGavoah LeTorah, established in the 1970s. The "Machon" operates a kollel / bet midrash for men, and a midrasha for women. The kollel offers traditional yeshiva studies with an emphasis on Talmud and Halakha (Jewish law), while the midrasha offers courses in Tanakh, practical Halakha, and Machshavah (Jewish philosophy). The midrasha is the largest in Israel. These programs are open to all students free of charge.

Yitzhak Rabin's convicted assassin, Yigal Amir, was a student of law and computer science at Bar-Ilan, prompting charges that the university had become a hotbed of political extremism. One of the steps taken by the university following the 1995 assassination was to encourage dialogue between left-wing and right-wing students.

Under university president Moshe Kaveh (1996–2013), Bar-Ilan underwent a major expansion, with new buildings added on the northern side of the campus. New science programs have been introduced, including a multidisciplinary brain research center  and a center for nanotechnology. The university has placed archaeology as one of its priorities, and this includes excavations such as the Tell es-Safi/Gath archaeological excavations and the recently opened Bar-Ilan University/Weizmann Institute of Science joint program in Archaeological Sciences.

Bar-Ilan's Faculty of Law made headlines in 2008 by achieving the highest average Israeli bar exam grade of 81.9 by its graduates. Daniel Hershkowitz was university president from 2013 to 2017.

Arie Zaban became the president of the university in 2017.

Academics
Bar-Ilan University has nine faculties: Exact Sciences, Life Sciences, Social Sciences, Education, Humanities, Jewish Studies, Medicine, Engineering, and Law. There is also a special Unit of Interdisciplinary Studies. At the undergraduate level, as mentioned, ten courses in Jewish studies related subjects are required from all students.

Bar-Ilan offers several special programs, including its international B.A. program, taught entirely in English, and is the first university in Israel to offer a full undergraduate program taught entirely in English. Currently students can choose between a B.A. degree in interdisciplinary social sciences, where students can choose between a macro track in economics, political sciences, and sociology, or the Micro Track in Criminology, Psychology, and Sociology, or a major in communications, with a minor in either English literature or political science. The degrees are internationally recognized and are open to students from all over the world.

In addition, Bar-Ilan offers a preparatory program that readies new immigrants for Israeli colleges. The university also runs a one-year overseas program called Tochnit Torah Im Derech Eretz, which combines traditional kollel Torah studies in the morning, separate for men and women, as well as co-ed general university studies and Jewish history classes in the afternoon. Many American students enrolled in regular programs of study in the university also take these Jewish history classes to fulfill their Jewish studies requirements.

Bar-Ilan also houses several research institutions such as the above-mentioned Gonda Multidisciplinary Brain Research Center, focused on neuroscience, which may have their own requirements.

Awards and recognition
The Bar Ilan Responsa Project was awarded the Israel Prize in 2007. The university's Bible project, in danger of being eliminated by continued budget cuts, was saved at the last minute by an anonymous donor.

In its capacity as a business school, Bar-Ilan was placed as the fourth best business school in Africa and the Middle East in the 2010 QS Global 200 Business Schools Report.

Notable alumni

 Zvi Arad (1942–2018) – mathematician, acting president of Bar-Ilan University, president of Netanya Academic College
 Ami Ayalon – former head of the Shin Bet and member of the Knesset for the Labor Party.
 Michael Ben-Ari – Israeli politician and formerly a member of the Knesset for the National Union Party.
 Kotel Da-Don – Croatian Orthodox rabbi of the Bet Israel community in Zagreb.
 Avi Dichter – former minister of home front defence. Former Shin Bet director.
 Yuval Diskin – 12th director of the Israeli Internal Security Service Shin Bet.
 Esther Farbstein – Holocaust scholar
 Baruch Fischer - Professor Emeritus in the Andrew and Erna Viterbi Faculty of Electrical and Computer Engineering at the Technion
 Tzipi Hotovely – Israeli diplomat and former politician who serves as the current ambassador of Israel to the United Kingdom. Formerly deputy minister of foreign affairs, minister of diaspora affairs, minister of settlement affairs, and as a member of the Knesset for the Likud Party
 Gila Gamliel – Israeli politician for the Likud Party. Formerly minister for social equality, and minister of environmental protection
 Anat Guetta – chair of the Israel Securities Authority (ISA) since 2018
 Michael Harris – named the best Israeli in the field of academics, as one of "The 10 Most Successful Israelis in 10 Different Fields in the World" by Maariv in April 2012.
 Joseph Klafter – chemical physics professor, the eighth president of Tel Aviv University
 Joshua Kulp – Talmudic scholar
 Norman Lebrecht (born 1948) – British commentator on music and cultural affairs, and novelist
 Tzipi Livni – Israeli lawyer and politician, head of the Opposition from 2009 to 2012. Formerly minister of justice, and in charge of negotiations with the Palestinians
 Gadeer Mreeh (born 1984) – first woman of Druze descent to become a member of the Knesset
 Orit Peleg – professor of biophysics at the University of Colorado
 Avi Weinroth – lawyer represents corporations in Israel and governmental companies.

Notable faculty

 Doron Aurbach
 Nathan Aviezer
 Moshe Bar
 Avi Bell
Pinkhos Churgin 
 Cyril Domb
 Shlomo Eckstein
 Adam Ferziger
 Jonathan Fox
 Hillel Furstenberg
 Ruth Halperin-Kaddari
 Oren Harman
 Shlomo Havlin
 Arye L. Hillman
 Max Jammer
 Efraim Karsh
 Mordechai Kedar
 Sarit Kraus
 Ernest Krausz
 Baruch Kurzweil
 Aren Maeir
 Arie Reich
 Tamar Ross
 Mary Schaps
 Daniel Sperber
 Avraham Trahtman
 Eli Vakil
 Zeev Zalevsky

Gallery

See also
 List of universities in Israel
 Ashkelon Academic College
 Kinneret College

References

External links

 
 BIU History
 Bar-Ilan University – Study Programs for Olim/Foreign Students
 Bar Ilan details in WHED (World Higher Education Database) Website (IAU-001455)
Bar-Ilan responsa website
 Bar-Ilan Faculty of Medicine
 Bar-Ilan Institute of Nanotechnology and Advanced Materials (BINA)
 Bar-Ilan Faculty of Law
  Bar-Ilan Students Union
  Amigos Latinoamericanos de la Universidad de Bar Ilan

 
Educational institutions established in 1955
Orthodox Jewish universities and colleges
Buildings and structures in Ramat Gan
Religious Zionism
Research institutes in Israel
Universities in Israel
Education in Tel Aviv District
1955 establishments in Israel
Law schools in Israel